SHVC may refer to:
 Save Happy Valley Coalition, a New Zealand environmental activist organization.
 Scalable High Efficiency Video Coding
 SHVC ("Super Home Video Computer"), the product code used by Nintendo for Super Famicom hardware and software in Japan